The Centre Algerien de la Cinematographie is a film archive in Algeria.

See also 
 List of archives in Algeria
 List of film archives
 Cinema of Algeria

External links 
 

Film archives in Africa
Archives in Algeria